The 2008 Vojko Herksel Cup was the 3rd Vojko Herksel Cup whose groups were held which took place at several venues across ex-Yugoslavia. In the Vojko Herksel Cup played 9 teams. Šibenik, a past winner of seasonal regional league, is secured directly to the final tournament, while the remaining 8 teams were divided into 3 groups, whose winners have secured the final tournament. The final tournament was held in Šibenik in Hall Baldekin.

Groups

Group A
Group A is played in Gospić, Croatia

Group B
Group B is played in Banja Luka, Bosnia and Herzegovina

Group C
Group C is played in Podgorica, Montenegro

Final tournament

Awards
MVP:  Marija Vrsaljko

References

Vojko Herksel Cup
2008–09 in European women's basketball
2008–09 in Montenegrin basketball
2008–09 in Croatian basketball
2008–09 in Serbian basketball
2008–09 in Slovenian basketball
2008–09 in Bosnia and Herzegovina basketball